DWCM is the callsign of the following radio stations in the Philippines:
 DWCM-AM, 1161 kHz, in Pangasinan, by Philippine Broadcasting Corporation
 DWCM-FM, 99.5 MHz, in Albay, by Pacific Broadcasting System